Bismarck Nhyra Appiah (born 19 January 1995) is a Ghanaian football forward, last playing for US Tataouine in Tunisia.

Career
He made his professional debut in the season 2013–14 when he joined Serbian First League side FK Sloga Petrovac na Mlavi. After playing two seasons with Sloga in Serbian second tier, Appiah returned to Africa and joined Gaborone United S.C. playing in Botswana Premier League. He was released by Gaborone Utd. in January 2016.

In summer 2016 he returned to Serbia and joined second-tier side FK Proleter Novi Sad, and on winter-break that season he moved to top-tier Serbian side OFK Bačka. He made his debut in the 2016–17 Serbian SuperLiga in a 23rd-round game of Bačka home against Red Star Belgrade. On 11 June 2017, Appiah signed with Mladost Lučani.

References

1995 births
Living people
Ghanaian footballers
Association football forwards
Ghanaian expatriate footballers
FK Sloga Petrovac na Mlavi players
FK Proleter Novi Sad players
OFK Bačka players
FK Mladost Lučani players
Serbian First League players
Serbian SuperLiga players
Expatriate footballers in Serbia
Gaborone United S.C. players
Expatriate footballers in Botswana
Jimma Aba Jifar F.C. players
Expatriate footballers in Ethiopia
Vision F.C. players
Expatriate footballers in Tunisia